Henry Coker (c.1528-95), of Mappowder, Dorset, was an English Member of Parliament.

He was a Member (MP) of the Parliament of England for Shaftesbury in 1559.

References

1528 births
1595 deaths
English MPs 1559
Politicians from Dorset